Awak Kuier (born 19 August 2001) is a Finnish basketball player with the Dallas Wings and the Finnish national team. Selected by the Wings with the second overall pick in the 2021 WNBA Draft, she was the second Finnish player in the history of the league after Taru Tuukkanen to be drafted, and she became the first Finnish player to play in the WNBA in May 2021.

Career 
Growing up watching Candace Parker highlights on YouTube, she joined her first organised basketball team at age 11 in Kotka, the only girls' club in the town. She then went on to join Peli-Karhut. At the age of 14, a video of her dunking went viral online. At the age of 16, she joined the Helsinki Basketball Academy.

She then later declined offers from American universities to sign a professional contract with Passalacqua Ragusa in Italy.

Selected 2nd overall in the 2021 WNBA Draft by the Dallas Wings, she was the first non-American player since Australia's Liz Cambage in 2011 to be selected in the first five picks of the draft. After missing the first few games of the 2021 season, she made her debut for the Wings on 27 May 2021, scoring a point, a rebound, and an assist in seven minutes of game time in a 101–95 loss to the Atlanta Dream. In addition to her speed and resilience, Kuier's features also include an exceptionally large, about seven-feet long lap space. On June 10, 2022, in a game against the Seattle Storm, Kuier became the 8th woman in WNBA history to dunk a basketball.

International career 
She represented Finland at the 2019 U18B FIBA Women's European Championship, winning the championship and being named tournament MVP. She was then named to the All-Star Five at the 2019 U20B FIBA Women's European Championship, helping Finland to a second-place finish.

WNBA career statistics

Regular season 

|-
| style="text-align:left;"| 2021
| style="text-align:left;"| Dallas
| 16 || 0 || 8.9 || .308 || .167 || .786 || 2.4 || 0.6 || 0.3 || 0.8 || 1.0 || 2.4
|-
| style="text-align:left;"| 2022
| style="text-align:left;"| Dallas
| 33 || 0 || 12.6 || .395 || .190 || .613 || 2.5 || 0.9 || 0.4 || 0.9 || 0.6 || 2.8
|-
| style="text-align:left;"| Career
| style="text-align:left;"| 2 years, 1 team
| 49 || 0 || 11.4 || .368 || .179 || .667 || 2.5 || 0.8 || 0.4 || 0.8 || 0.7 || 2.6

Postseason 

|-
| style="text-align:left;"| 2021
| style="text-align:left;"| Dallas
| 1 || 0 || 8.0 || .000 || .000 || .000 || 3.0 || 0.0 || 0.0 || 0.0 || 1.0 || 0.0
|-
| style="text-align:left;"| 2022
| style="text-align:left;"| Dallas
| 3 || 0 || 5.0 || .000 || .000 || .000 || 1.7 || 0.0 || 0.0 || 0.7 || 0.0 || 0.0
|-
| style="text-align:left;"| Career
| style="text-align:left;"| 2 years, 1 team
| 4 || 0 || 5.8 ||  .000 || .000 || .000 || 2.0 || 0.0 || 0.0 || 0.5 || 0.3 || 0.0

Personal life 
She was born in Cairo, Egypt and is of South Sudanese origin. She moved to Finland as a refugee with her family when she was two years old, first settling in the city of Kotka. Today, her family has settled in the coastal town of Uusikaupunki and she holds dual Finnish and Egyptian citizenship. She speaks Italian, Arabic, Finnish, and English. Kuier has four older brothers and her parents are Jehovah's Witnesses.

References

2001 births
Living people
Dallas Wings draft picks
Dallas Wings players
Egyptian emigrants to Finland
Egyptian people of South Sudanese descent
Finnish people of South Sudanese descent
Finnish women's basketball players
People from Kotka
People from Uusikaupunki
Refugees in Egypt
Refugees in Finland
South Sudanese emigrants
South Sudanese refugees
Sportspeople from Cairo